These are the official results of the women's 800 metres event at the 1996 Summer Olympics in Atlanta, Georgia, United States. There were a total of 37 competitors from 31 countries.

Medalists

Records
These were the standing world and Olympic records (in minutes) prior to the 1996 Summer Olympics.

Results

Heats
Qualification: First 2 in each heat (Q) and the next 6 fastest (q) qualified to the semifinals.

Semifinals
Qualification: First 4 in each heat (Q) qualified directly to the final.

Final

See also
Men's 800 metres

References

External links
 Official Report
 Results

8
800 metres at the Olympics
1996 in women's athletics
Women's events at the 1996 Summer Olympics